is a Japanese historical manga series written and illustrated by Nanahiko Takagi. An anime television series adaptation by NAZ aired from July 11 to September 26, 2018.

The term Angolmois comes from the prophecies of Nostradamus about the reign of the great king of Angolmois, which is interpreted as being an anagram of the Old French word Mongolais 'Mongolians' and thus referring to Genghis Khan.

Plot
The story follows a group of prisoners who are exiled to Tsushima Island to help form a first line of defense against the first Mongol invasion of Japan in 1274. They first join the Sō clan who then join with the Toi Barai clan to fight the invaders consisting mainly of Mongolian and Goryeo forces, but also including Jurchen people.

Characters

Exiles

He is the main character, samurai and excellent swordsman using the Gekei sword style used by Yoshitsune. He is a former retainer of the Kamakura Shogunate and is one of the prisoners from Hakozaki exiled to Tsushima Island. He was imprisoned for being too radical, despite the fact that his master was pardoned posthumously. He had a family, and his child died in a plague.

A large man with sharpened teeth. He is a former pirate who was captured by Jinzaburō which leads to some resentment. He fights with a kanabō war club.

A former gokenin noble who lost his lands and title. He prefers fighting on horseback.

A short man from Song China and a former merchant who claims to have been the richest man in Hakozaki and have a treasure hidden away.

A boy arrested for thievery. He has an excellent night vision and often scouts for the group.

An aloof man and an excellent archer.

Dōen is a monk and self-proclaimed doctor.

A former jitō manor steward who murdered his brother. He doubts whether defending Tsushima Island is worthwhile and attempts to side with the Mongols.

Sō Clan

Princess Teruhi is the daughter of Sō Sukekuni, head of the Sō clan on Tsushima Island.

He is the leader of the Sō clan on Tsushima Island. Loves to relive his glorified past. Died at the hands of Goryeo.

He is a Tsushima soldier and Sō Sukekuni's adopted son.

He is a soldier, responsible for the protection of Princess Teruhi.

She is Princess Teruhi's servant

Toi Barai

Leader of the Toi Barai. Based in Kanatanoki castle.

A young dark-skinned woman. She is a fierce fighter and an ama diver. 

A young girl who often teases Amushi. She has a pet Tsushima leopard cat.

Kamakura Shogunate

Shikken of the Kamakura shogunate.

Retainer of the Tokusō.

 He is the Shogunate High General of the Kamakura shogunate and asks Kuchii Jinzaburō to help delay the Mongol forces who land on Tsushima Island.

Yuan dynasty Mongol Empire

Marshal of the Mongol forces.

Mongolian royalty and a Mingghan general.

A Jurchen Vice-marshal

A Korean Vice-marshal

Korea

General of the Goryeo forces. His son was a Mingghan commander that was killed by Kuchii Jinzaburō.

Others

Former child-Emperor of Japan who supposedly drowned 90 years previously. He is the great-grandfather of Teruhi.

Henry II the Pious

Duke of Silesia and Cracow. Killed by Mongols.

Media

Manga
Nanahiko Takagi launched the series in Kadokawa Shoten's Samurai Ace magazine on February 26, 2013. The series went on hiatus after Samurai Ace ceased publication in December 2013. It was then moved to Kadokawa's ComicWalker app starting on July 11, 2014. The last chapter was released on ComicWalker on August 22, 2018. The series was collected in ten volumes released from February 10, 2015, to August 25, 2018. A sequel, Angolmois: Genbai Senki Hakata, started on ComicWalker on January 2, 2019.

Anime
Kadokawa announced the anime adaptation at their Anime Expo booth on July 1, 2017. The series is directed by Takayuki Kuriyama and written by Shogo Yasukawa, with animation by studio NAZ. Masayori Komine served as both character designer and as chief animation director. Kumiko Habara served as assistant director. Straightener performed the series' opening theme song, "Braver", and SHE'S performed the ending theme song "Upside Down".

The series aired from July 11 to September 26, 2018, and broadcast on Sun TV, Tokyo MX, KBS Kyoto, TV Aichi, TVQ Broadcasting Kyushu, and BS11. It ran for 12 episodes. Crunchyroll simulcast the series worldwide outside of Asia, Australia, and New Zealand.

Notes

References

External links
  
  
 

Historical anime and manga
Kadokawa Shoten manga
Kadokawa Dwango franchises
Medialink
Naz (studio)
Samurai in anime and manga
Seinen manga